Streptomyces sudanensis is a bacterium species from the genus of Streptomyces which has been isolated from patients with actinomycosis infections in Sudan.

See also 
 List of Streptomyces species

References 

 

sudanensis
Bacteria described in 2008